Nestier is a French commune located in the department of Hautes-Pyrenees, in the region Occitanie. Its historic region is the Gascony.

Its geography is that of a village of Piedmont Pyrenean characterized by a mountain climate subject to ocean and continental influences.

Its history is marked by the following periods : the prehistory with the remains of the Neanderthal cave of the "Cap de la Bielle" ; Modern era with two central characters : François de Saint-Paul and Louis de Cazaux, Lords de Nestier, the first large army officer of Louis XIV and Governor of the "Val de Aran", the second large master of the Cavalry School of Versailles and squire Cavalcadour of Louis XV ; the post-revolutionary period : Nestier is then chief town of canton and sees the construction of the devotional site called "Calvaire du Mont-Arès" ; the contemporary period with the reconstruction of the calvary registered with the inventory of the historical monuments and the realization of a organic swim.

Its peasant sociology has been strongly marked by the pyrenean traditions and the lifestyles that rest essentially, until the middle of XXe s., on a polyculture of subsistence.

At XXIe s., Nestier undergoes the deep transformations of the rural world within a new territorial reorganization.

Geography

Climate

Nestier has a oceanic climate (Köppen climate classification Cfb).

See also
Communes of the Hautes-Pyrénées department

References

External links
 Web site of the Association Les Amis de Nestier et du Vallon de Bouchère

Communes of Hautes-Pyrénées